An immersed tube (or immersed tunnel) is a kind of undersea tunnel composed of segments, constructed elsewhere and floated to the tunnel site to be sunk into place and then linked together. They are commonly used for road and rail crossings of rivers, estuaries and sea channels/harbours. Immersed tubes are often used in conjunction with other forms of tunnel at their end, such as a cut and cover or bored tunnel, which is usually necessary to continue the tunnel from near the water's edge to the entrance (portal) at the land surface.

Construction

The tunnel is made up of separate elements, each prefabricated in a manageable length, then having the ends sealed with bulkheads so they can be floated. At the same time, the corresponding parts of the path of the tunnel are prepared, with a trench on the bottom of the channel being dredged and graded to fine tolerances to support the elements. The next stage is to place the elements into place, each towed to the final location, in most cases requiring some assistance to remain buoyant. Once in position, additional weight is used to sink the element into the final location, this being a critical stage to ensure each piece is aligned correctly. After being put into place, the joint between the new element and the tunnel is emptied of water then made water tight, this process continuing sequentially along the tunnel.

The trench is then backfilled and any necessary protection, such as rock armour, added over the top. The ground beside each end tunnel element will often be reinforced, to permit a tunnel boring machine to drill the final links to the portals on land. After these stages the tunnel is complete, and the internal fitout can be carried out.

The segments of the tube may be constructed in one of two methods. In the United States, the preferred method has been to construct steel or cast iron tubes which are then lined with concrete. This allows use of conventional shipbuilding techniques, with the segments being launched after assembly in dry docks. In Europe, reinforced concrete box tube construction has been the standard; the sections are cast in a basin which is then flooded to allow their removal.

Advantages and disadvantages
The main advantage of an immersed tube is that they can be considerably more cost effective than alternative options – i.e., a bored tunnel beneath the water being crossed (if indeed this is possible at all due to other factors such as the geology and seismic activity) or a bridge. Other advantages relative to these alternatives include:
 Their speed of construction
 Minimal disruption to the river/channel, if crossing a shipping route
 Resistance to seismic activity
 Safety of construction (for example, work in a dry dock as opposed to boring beneath a river)
 Flexibility of profile (although this is often partly dictated by what is possible for the connecting tunnel types)

Disadvantages include:
 Immersed tunnels are often partly exposed (usually with some rock armour and natural siltation) on the river/sea bed, risking a sunken ship/anchor strike
 Direct contact with water necessitates careful waterproofing design around the joints
 The segmental approach requires careful design of the connections, where longitudinal effects and forces must be transferred across
 Environmental impact of tube and underwater embankment on existing channel/sea bed.

Tubes can be round, oval and rectangular. Larger strait crossings have selected wider rectangular shapes as more cost effective for wider tunnels.

Examples 

The first tunnel constructed with this method was the Shirley Gut Siphon, a six-foot sewer main laid in Boston, Massachusetts in 1893. The first example built to carry traffic was the Michigan Central Railway Tunnel constructed in 1910 under the Detroit River, and the first to carry road traffic is the Posey Tube, linking the cities of Alameda and Oakland, California in 1928. The oldest immersed tube in Europe is the Maastunnel in Rotterdam, which opened in 1942.

Construction began in 2004 and revenue service began in 2013.

Currently the longest immersed tube tunnel is the  tunnel portion of the Hong Kong–Zhuhai–Macau Bridge, completed in 2018. The SZB project includes a  immersed tube which also will be the world's widest immersed tube, carrying eight traffic lanes.

Construction started on 1 January 2021.

Notes

See also 
 Submerged floating tunnel

References

External links 
 , by Stockholm City Line
 
 
 

Tunnel construction